Magnetic Field Remixes is a compilation album by Chemlab, released on October 11, 1994 by Fifth Colvmn and Metal Blade Records. It served as a way for the band to reissue their 1990 debut EP 10 Ton Pressure with an expanded track listing and the then unreleased song "21st Century".

Reception

A critic at allmusic awarded the Magnetic Field Remixes compilation three out of five stars. Sonic Boom described the presentation and mastering as "damn impressive" but was negatively critical of the lyrics, compositions and vocal performances.

Track listing

Personnel
Adapted from the Magnetic Field Remixes liner notes.

Chemlab
 Joe Frank – programming, production, engineering
 Jared Louche – lead vocals, production, engineering, illustrations, design
 Dylan Thomas Moore – programming, production, engineering

Additional performers
 Howie Beno – remix (3)
 John DeSalvo – drums
 Geno Lenardo – EBow, guitar
 Krayge Tyler – guitar

Production and design
 Craig Albertson – illustrations, design
 Hilary Bercovici – production, engineering
 Aaron Falk – recording
 Greg Johnson – design
 Newton Moore – cover art, photography
 Zalman Fishman – executive-producer

Release history

References

External links 
 

1994 compilation albums
Chemlab albums
Fifth Colvmn Records compilation albums
Metal Blade Records compilation albums
Albums produced by Jared Louche